Hilbert's ninth problem, from the list of 23 Hilbert's problems (1900), asked to find the most general reciprocity law for the norm residues of k-th order in a general algebraic number field, where k is a power of a prime.

Progress made 

The problem was partially solved by Emil Artin (1924; 1927; 1930) by establishing the Artin reciprocity law which deals with abelian extensions of algebraic number fields. Together with the work of Teiji Takagi and Helmut Hasse (who established the more general Hasse reciprocity law), this led to the development of the class field theory, realizing Hilbert's program in an abstract fashion. Certain explicit formulas for norm residues were later found by Igor Shafarevich (1948; 1949; 1950).
 
The non-abelian generalization, also connected with Hilbert's twelfth problem, is one of the long-standing challenges in number theory and is far from being complete.

See also
List of unsolved problems in mathematics

References

External links 
 English translation of Hilbert's original address

Algebraic number theory
Unsolved problems in number theory
09